Cohen vs. Rosi is a 1998 Argentine romantic comedy film directed by Daniel Barone and written by Jacobo Langsner. It stars Alfredo Alcón, Adrián Suar and Laura Novoa. The film premiered on 28 May 1998 in Buenos Aires.

Plot

Cast 
 Adrián Suar as Ariel Cohen
 Laura Novoa as Carla Rosi
 Alfredo Alcón as Américo Rosi/Mirta 'La Nona' Rosi
 Norman Erlich as David Cohen
 José Soriano as Elías Cohen (as Pepe Soriano)
 Roberto Carnaghi as Giancarlo Rosi
 Gabriela Acher as Miriam Cohen
 Rita Cortese as Angélica Rosi
 Virginia Innocenti as Sofía Rosi
 Favio Posca as Salvador Rosi
 Rolly Serrano as bodyguard
 Claudio Giúdice as bodyguard
 Diego Peretti as Cameraman
 Víctor Anakarato as Transvestite
 Florencia De la Vega as Transvestite
 Cecilia Cambiaso as Cohens' house maid
 Pía Uribelarrea as nurse
 Edda Díaz as Sado-neighbour
 Julio López as Sado-neighbour
 Tito Haas as driver
 Jorge Noya as President

References

External links 
 
 

1998 films
1990s Spanish-language films
1998 romantic comedy films
Films shot in Buenos Aires
Argentine romantic comedy films
Films distributed by Disney
1990s Argentine films